This was the inaugural edition of the doubles competition of the 2022 Forlì Open tennis tournament.

Nicolás Barrientos and Miguel Ángel Reyes-Varela won the title after defeating Sadio Doumbia and Fabien Reboul 7–5, 4–6, [10–4] in the final.

Seeds

Draw

External links
 Main draw

Forlì Open - Doubles
2022 Doubles